Adelino Batista da Silva Neto (born 27 January 1973), known as Adelino Batista, is a Brazilian professional footballer.

Career
Adelino Batista played for Sampaio Corrêa in 2000 Campeonato Maranhense.

He played for León in 2000-01 season, and Correcaminos UAT in Primera División A Verano 2003.

He then signed for Treze in January 2005. He is the runner-up goalscorer of Campeonato Paraibano 2005. He also played in Brasileiro Série C and scored.

After just scored once for Bahia in Campeonato Baiano, he re-signed Treze in August 2006 for their Série C campaign.

He then joined ABC in 2007, for their Campeonato Potiguar.

he signed a two-month contract with Arapiraquense in June 2007, for their Série C 2007.

In December 2007, he signed a contract until the end of Campeonato Sergipano for Confiança.

References

External links
 CBF
 

1973 births
Living people
Brazilian footballers
Liga MX players
Sampaio Corrêa Futebol Clube players
Campinense Clube players
Treze Futebol Clube players
Esporte Clube Bahia players
ABC Futebol Clube players
Associação Desportiva Confiança players
Club León footballers
Correcaminos UAT footballers
Brazilian expatriate footballers
Expatriate footballers in Mexico
People from Campina Grande
Association football forwards
Sportspeople from Paraíba